The International Specialized Hospital of Uganda (ISHU) is a public, specialized, referral tertiary care medical facility under construction in Uganda. The hospital is expected to take two years to construct. The private developers who are constructing the hospital will operate it for ten years, then turn it over to the government of Uganda, in a public-private partnership arrangement.

Location

Overview
The ISHU is a specialized referral, tertiary treatment, research, and teaching hospital, which is intended to treat patients travelling out of the country to seek specialized medical care. In 2017, it was estimated that Ugandan patients spent an estimated US$186 million on medical treatment abroad.

On 1 June 2017, the president of Uganda, Yoweri Museveni, performed the groundbreaking ceremony for the hospital. The development, designed by the architectural firm of Progetto CMR, of Milan, Italy, consists of nine buildings. These include the 260+ bed hospital, an outpatient department to handle 100 outpatients daily, housing for doctors, nurses and support staff, conference facilities, at least one hotel and a shopping centre.

The hospital is expected to cover a wide range of medical and surgical conditions, including organ transplants, neurosurgical operations, various cancers and orthopedic surgery and cardiac operations and treatments. The hospital design involves the installation of solar panels on the roofs of the buildings, to generate electricity and reduce the power purchased from the national grid. The design also involves the installation of rain-water harvesting systems, to reduce the amount of water purchased from the National Water and Sewerage Corporation.

International collaboration
Following completion, a 10-year operation period will be accorded to the developers, in order for them to recoup their investment. Following that, the ownership of the institution will revert to the Ugandan government. The facility is expected to attract referrals from the countries of the African Great Lakes region.

In September 2018, the Daily Monitor reported that the Ugandan Cabinet had resolved to ban the use of public funds to treat government officials and politicians at foreign medical facilities, once this hospital is completed. This will save government an estimated US$7–10 million every year.

Parliamentary approval
In March 2019, the Parliament of Uganda approved a government guarantee of US$379.7 million (USh1.3 trillion) to construct this hospital. A consortium comprising Finasi of Italy and ROKO Construction Limited of Uganda, was selected to construct the hospital. The facility will include an 80-bed cancer centre.

See also
 Hospitals in Uganda

References

External links
 President Yoweri Musveni Flags Off Construction of International Specialized Hospital of Uganda
 Health: Museveni to Commission Specialised Referral Hospital in Lubowa

Medical research institutes in Uganda
Buildings and structures in Uganda
Hospitals in Uganda
Proposed infrastructure in Uganda
Wakiso District
Teaching hospitals in Uganda